Jeju 4.3 Peace Park (제주4·3평화공원) is a memorial park and museum located on the island of Jeju in South Korea to commemorate the losses suffered during the Jeju uprising.  The Peace Park opened on March 28, 2008 as part of reparations for victims based on the findings from the Jeju 4.3 Committee which was commissioned in 2000.

The Jeju uprising was a series of incidents where 25,000 to 30,000 Jeju residents were killed as a result of clashes between armed civilians and military forces.

Memorial Hall 

The Memorial Hall is a multi-story facility that has exhibits that explain the Jeju uprising.  Most of the displays are in both Korean and English.

Memorial Park 

The park ground covers 359,380 square meters (88.8 acres) and includes a memorial monument.  The monument is a circular area that has names of deceased listed on tablets that are erected around the circumference.  There is also a memorial statue that depicts four adults and a child.

References 

Museums in Jeju Province
Parks in Jeju Province